Freemasonry in Lebanon started with the charter of a Lodge by the Grand Lodge of Scotland in 1861, and has expanded to include Lodges working in multiple languages (including Arabic, English, and French) and chartered under multiple jurisdictions and streams. There are four regular and recognised Jurisdictions, and over two dozens of clandestine and irregular lodges

History
The first regular Masonic Lodge to be erected in Lebanon was chartered by the Grand Lodge of Scotland on May 6, 1861 and was given the name Palestine Lodge No. 415 and operated in French. This lodge was operating in Beirut but then it became dormant in 1895. Four other Scottish lodges were chartered in Lebanon before the First World War. The Grand Orient of France chartered a lodge in 1869, working in Arabic. Two further lodges followed, but none survived the First World War.

Other new lodges formed prior to World War I was a lodge in Beirut under the Ottoman Grand Lodge (later the Grand Lodge of Turkey), and another under the National Grand Lodge of Egypt, formed around 1914. Several other Egyptian-warranted lodges were chartered thereafter, and after the First World War, these were formed into a District Grand Lodge. By the end of World War Two, these lodges were extinct, merged, or had changed jurisdictional authority.

In 1955 the Grand Lodge of New York consecrated the District Grand Lodge of Syria-Lebanon on August 22, 1955, by Past Grand Master of the Grand Lodge of New York M∴ W∴ Charles W. Frossel, who flew to Lebanon for that purpose.  The first lodge, Syrio-American Lodge No. 1, was consecrated in 1924; 12 lodges were chartered & consecrated in all, 11 in Lebanon and 1 in Syria.  Of these the 11 lodges in Lebanon remain active - the one in Syria, Ibrahim El Khalil Lodge No. 4 in Damascus, Syria, went dormant after the 1967 war (Originally consecrated in 1927.).

In 2010, the Grand Lodge of Washington, D.C. chartered their first lodge in Lebanon, Phoenix Lodge No. 1001 in Al Fanar, Lebanon. In 2018, a French-speaking lodge under the name of Cadmus Lodge No. 1002 was also chartered, bringing the total number of lodges operating under the Grand Lodge of Washington, D.C. to two.

In 2013, the District Grand Lodge of Lebanon was formed under the auspices of the Grand Lodge of Scotland. Operating within its framework were 6 Lodges; Lodge Peace 908 (Arabic speaking meets in Fanar), Lodge Kadisha 1002 (English speaking meets in Fanar), Lodge Zahle 1047 (Arabic speaking meets in Zahle), Lodge El Mizab 1130 (Arabic speaking meets in El Mina Tripoli), Lodge Mount Lebanon 1312 (Arabic speaking meets in Koura), Lodge Harmony 1830 (English speaking meets in Zahle).

Since then, 4 more Lodges have been formed to bring the number of Lodges operating under the District Grand Lodge of Lebanon to 10, namely Lodge Pythagoras 1841 (English speaking meets in Fanar), Lodge King Hiram 1351 (English speaking meets in Fanar), Lodge Trinity 1846 (English Speaking meets in Fanar), and Lodge Al Nour 1847 (English speaking meets in Chtaura).

In 2018, 3 lodges in the District Grand Lodge of Syria-Lebanon (under the Grand Lodge of New York) were granted a charter from the Grand Lodge of New York (and Most Worshipful William M. Sandone, Grand Master) to form their own Grand Lodge, "The Grand Lodge of Free & Accepted Masons of Lebanon."

References

External links 
 The District Grand Lodge of Lebanon under the jurisdiction of the Grand Lodge of Scotland
 The Free and Accepted Masons of DC in Lebanon (Phoenix Lodge No. 1001 and Cadmus Lodge No. 1002) under the jurisdiction of the Grand Lodge of the District of Columbia.

 
1861 establishments in the Ottoman Empire